Duncan Crowie (born 29 May 1963) is a retired South African football (soccer) striker who mostly played for Santos Cape Town.

References

1963 births
Living people
Association football forwards
South African soccer players
Santos F.C. (South Africa) players
Sportspeople from Cape Town
Cape Coloureds
South Africa international soccer players